Dolje is a settlement on the left bank of the Soča River northwest of Tolmin in the Littoral region of Slovenia.

References

External links
Dolje on Geopedia

Populated places in the Municipality of Tolmin